Bagumbong High School (Filipino: Mataas na Paaralan ng Bagumbong; abbreviated as BHS; also called as BHS-Main) is one of the public junior and senior high schools in Caloocan. It is located at Rainbow Village 5 Subdivision, Bagumbong, Caloocan, Metro Manila, Philippines. It was first established on 15 June 1967 and its former name was Bagumbong Barangay High School. This school is headed by a principal, under Noel G. Quibuyen.

History
Bagumbong Barangay High School was established on 15 June 1967 by the request of former principal of Bagumbong Elementary School, Luis Reodique with the help of the PTA headed by their president, Marcelo Ramos, submitted to then Mayor Macario Asistio, Sr.. The request was made due to the barangay's educational problem. Most of the residents of their barangay are only elementary graduates because they find it very difficult to send their children to Novaliches High School (which is the nearest high school in their area) to pursue their secondary education.

BBHS then, was first opened for the school year 1967–1968. The first batch of First Year students were only 27 young boys and girls. Their first teachers were Roberto Bustos, Lolita Aspe, Felicidad delos Reyes, Heidi Quiambao, Lino Ramos, & Adelaida Clamor.

The following school year, the school admitted students for the Second Year level until 2 years later, the First Commencement Exercises was held at the grounds of Bagumbong Elementary School together with the elementary students.

In 1985, BBHS was turned into an independent high school and became Bagumbong High School, which was the present name of the school.

Adelaida Gagarra, then Officer-in-Charge of the school, with the help of her brother, then Councilor Leonardo Clamor, found a larger land space for the school, which was in Rainbow Village 5 Subdivision, Bagumbong, Caloocan (the present location of the school). On 1 June 1988, the construction of the school's new location was started. The following year, Gagarra, together with the students and teachers, transferred to the new school site.

Many changes and improvements were done in the following years. Today, the school has ten classroom buildings, a covered court with bleachers, a small garden and park, and complete facilities.

Appointed principals

Classes offered
Junior High School

Grade 7
Grade 8
Grade 9
Grade 10
Open High School (for Grades 7 to 10)

See also
Caloocan
University of Caloocan City

High schools in Metro Manila
Educational institutions established in 1967
Schools in Caloocan
Public schools in Metro Manila